The Candeleros Formation (formerly known as the Candeleros Member of the "Río Limay Formation") is a geologic formation that crops out in the Río Negro, Neuquén, and Mendoza provinces of northern Patagonia, Argentina. It is the oldest formation in the Neuquén Group and belongs to the Rio Limay Subgroup. Formerly that subgroup was treated as a formation, and the Candeleros Formation was known as the Candeleros Member.

Description 
The type locality of the Candeleros Formation is Candeleros Hill in Neuquén Province, after which the formation was named by Wichmann in 1929. This formation unconformably overlies the Lohan Cura Formation, and it is in turn overlain by the Huincul Formation, also a unit of the Neuquén Group. The sediments of the latter are of lighter greenish and yellow colors and the boundary between the Candeleros and Huincul formations is easily recognizable.

Overall, the formation represents a part of the ancient Kokorkom desert with braided river system, made up mostly of sandstones and conglomerates. There are also isolated sections that represent eolian (wind-blown) deposition, as well as siltstones deposited under swamp conditions. Paleosols (soil deposits) are common in some sections as well.

Fossil content 

The Candeleros Formation has a very diverse fossil fauna, including:
 dipnoan fish (including Ceratodus argentinus)
 frogs
 Rhynchocephalians (including Priosphenodon avelasi and Tika giacchinoi)
 primitive snakes (including Najash rionegrina)
 several turtles (including 2 species of Prochelidella)
 rebbachisaurid sauropods (Limaysaurus, Nopcsaspondylus and Rayososaurus)
 titanosaurian sauropods (including Andesaurus and a second unnamed huge titanosaur)
 abelisaurid theropods (Ekrixinatosaurus and unnamed form)
 a carcharodontosaurid (Giganotosaurus)
 a dromaeosaurid theropod (Buitreraptor gonzalezorum)
 an alvarezsauroid theropod (Alnashetri)
 a basal coelurosaurian (Bicentenaria)
 Iguanodonts
 a basal thyreophoran (Jakapil)
 cladotherian mammals (including Cronopio dentiacutus)
 ichnofossils of Sousaichnum monettae, Limayichnus major, Bonaparteichnum tali, Bressaniichnus patagonicus, Deferraiichnum mapuchense, Abelichnus astigarragae and Picunichnus benedettoiIn 2021, fossil material of a giant titanosaur sauropod, distinct from Andesaurus and probably exceeding Patagotitan in size, was described from the formation by Otero et al.'' (2021).

See also 
 List of fossil sites
 Bajo Barreal Formation, contemporaneous fossiliferous formation of the San Jorge Basin
 Cerro Fortaleza Formation, contemporaneous fossiliferous formation of the Austral Basin
 Alcântara Formation, contemporaneous fossiliferous formation of the São Luís-Grajaú Basin, Brazil
 List of dinosaur bearing rock formations

References

Bibliography 
  
  
 
 
 
 

 
Geologic formations of Argentina
Cretaceous Argentina
Sandstone formations
Aeolian deposits
Fluvial deposits
Paludal deposits